The Georgia Trust for Historic Preservation is the United States' largest statewide, nonprofit preservation organization with more than 8,000 members. Founded in 1973 by Mary Gregory Jewett and others, the Trust is committed to preserving and enhancing Georgia's communities and their diverse historic resources for the education and enjoyment of all.

The Georgia Trust generates community revitalization by finding buyers for endangered properties acquired by its Revolving Fund; encourages neighborhood revitalization and provides design assistance to 105 Georgia Main Street cities; trains Georgia's teachers to engage students in 61 Georgia school systems to discover state and national history through their local historic resources; and advocates for funding, tax incentives and other laws aiding preservation efforts.  The Georgia Trust is a recipient of the Trustees Award for Organizational Excellence from the National Trust for Historic Preservation.  

The Georgia Trust operates two historic house museums:
 Hay House, 1859, Macon
 Rhodes Hall, 1904, Atlanta

Georgia Trust Programs 
In addition to providing preservation resources for individuals and communities throughout the state, The Georgia Trust helps save endangered houses and buildings, uncover the beauty of downtown buildings, educate the next preservation generation, and advocate for preservation funding and laws through the following programs:

Revolving Fund for Endangered Properties 
The Georgia Trust for Historic Preservation established the Revolving Fund for endangered properties in 1990 to provide effective alternatives to demolition or neglect of architecturally and historically significant properties by promoting rehabilitation and enabling owners of endangered historic properties to connect with buyers who will rehabilitate their properties.

The Revolving Fund accomplishes this goal by either accepting property donations or by purchasing options on endangered historic properties. The properties are then marketed nationally to locate buyers who agree to preserve and maintain the structures. Protective covenants are attached to the deeds to ensure that the historic integrity of each property is retained, and purchasers are required to sign rehabilitation agreements based on the work to be performed on the structure.

Main Street Design Assistance Program 
Since the Main Street program's start in 1980, The Georgia Trust has offered design assistance, on-site rehabilitation consultations, hands-on presentations and hand-drawn and digital renderings to help business owners and downtown managers rehabilitate and reuse their historic resources.

Services provided by The Georgia Trust's Main Street Design Assistance Program have become integral to downtown revitalization efforts. Supported by the Department of Community Affairs' (DCA) Office of Downtown Development, the program has assisted more than 3,000 business owners in 105 Main Street cities across Georgia to encourage the rehabilitation of historic downtown commercial buildings.

Talking Walls 
A recipient of a Governor's Award in the Humanities, the Talking Walls heritage education program has trained more than 1,700 teachers, who have reached more than 370,000 students in 61 school systems in Georgia since 1991. The program's teacher workshops and ongoing local support trains educators to use local historic resources such as photos, maps, oral histories and historic buildings as teaching tools in Georgia's mandated curriculum.

The Georgia Department of Education recently emphasized the Trust's key role as an important educational resource by approving the Trust as a partner in its Educational Initiatives Program. This status recognizes The Georgia Trust as an official collaborator with the DOE to provide quality instructional materials to educators across the state. Talking Walls also received statewide certification by the Georgia DOE, allowing the Trust to award professional recertification credits to teachers attending program workshops.

Georgians for Preservation Action 
Founded in 1987, the statewide coordinating council for historic preservation advocacy encourages laws, programs and policies that promote the preservation of Georgia's historic resources by mobilizing grassroots preservationists across the state.

Among its activities, GaPA:

 Annually develops and advocates a legislative agenda that represents a consensus of the leaders of key preservation constituencies on preservation issues. 
 Regularly communicates with historic preservation advocates about critical issues and legislation before the General Assembly. 
 Hosts a Legislative Reception for preservation supporters to meet with legislators. 
 Provides GaPA members with information on national preservation issues with news from the National Trust for Historic Preservation and Preservation Action, the national lobbying arm for historic preservation.

Places in Peril 
The Georgia Trust releases an annual list of endangered historic sites throughout Georgia. The Places in Peril program seeks to identify significant historic, archaeological and cultural properties that are threatened by demolition, deterioration or insensitive public policy or development, and have a demonstrable level of community interest, commitment and support. Through this program, the Trust encourages owners and individuals, organizations and communities to employ preservation tools, partnerships and resources necessary to preserve and utilize selected historic properties in peril.

Historic properties are selected for listing based on several criteria. Sites must be listed or eligible for listing in the National Register of Historic Places or the Georgia Register of Historic Places and must be subject to a serious threat to their existence or historical, architectural and/or archeological integrity. There must also be a demonstrable level of community commitment and support for the preservation of listed sites.

The 2006 Places in Peril list includes
Terrell County Courthouse, Dawson
Auburn Avenue Commercial District, Atlanta
Andalusia, Milledgeville
Pasaquan, Marion County, Buena Vista
Downtown Hartwell
U.S. Highway 17, Brunswick
Old Hawkinsville High School
Ponce de Leon Apartments, Atlanta
City Mills, Columbus
Cowen Farmstead, Acworth

The 2007 "Places in Peril" list includes
Tybee Island Raised Cottages
Cherokee Structures, North Georgia
City Auditorium, Waycross
Gilmer County Courthouse, Elijay
Eleanor Roosevelt School, Warm Springs
Hand Trading Company Building, Pelham
Herndon Home, Atlanta
Aluminum Hill Mill Workers' Houses, Eatonton
Virginia-Highland Neighborhood, Atlanta
Wren's Nest, Atlanta

The 2008 "Places in Peril" list includes
Adam-Strain Building, Darien - now slated to be saved
The Castle, Atlanta
Old Clinton Historic District, Gray
Cockspur Island Lighthouse, Tybee Island
Meriwether County Jail, Greenville
A.L. Miller Senior High School for Girls, Macon
Spencer House, Columbus
Sunbury Historic Colonial Town Site, Sunbury
Trinity C.M.E. Church, Augusta
University of Georgia Marine Institute Greenhouse & Administration Building, Sapelo Island

The 2009 "Places in Peril" list includes
Battery Backus, Tybee Island
John Berrien House, Savannah
Bibb Mill, Columbus
Campbell Chapel AME Church, Americus
Crum & Forster Building, Atlanta
Fort Daniel, Buford
Mary Ray Memorial School, Newnan-Coweta County
Metcalfe Township, Thomas County
Rock House, Thomson
Sallie Davis House, Milledgeville

The 2010 "Places in Peril" list includes
Central State Hospital, Milledgeville
Paradise Gardens, Summerville
Morris Brown College, Atlanta
Canton Grammar School, Canton
Leake Archaeological Site, Cartersville
Dorchester Academy, Midway
Old Dodge County Jail, Eastman
Ritz Theatre, Thomaston
Herndon Plaza, Atlanta
Capricorn Recording Studio, Macon

The 2015 "Places in Peril" list includes
The East Point Historic Civic Block, East Point
 The Dart House (1877), Brunswick (demolished)

The 2017 Places in Peril list includes
Atlanta Central Library (1980), Atlanta, Fulton County, designed by Marcel Breuer.
Calvary Episcopal Church (1921) and Lee Street Bridge, Americus, Sumter County
Chivers House (1920), Dublin, Laurens County
Marble YMCA Building, Columbus, Muscogee County
Gaines Hall (1869), Furber Cottage (1899), Towns House (1910) and the Hamilton House (1950), Atlanta, Fulton County
John Rountree Log House (1832), Twin City in Emanuel County
Lyon Farmhouse (c.1820-1830), Lithonia, DeKalb County
Mimosa Hall (1840), Roswell, Fulton County
Walker House (Augusta, Georgia) (1895), in Richmond County, Georgia, associated with minister Charles T. Walker within the historic African-American Laney-Walker Neighborhood
Old Zebulon Elementary School, Zebulon, in Pike County

Publications

The Rambler 

The Rambler is The Georgia Trust's quarterly publication. It is distributed to members of The Georgia Trust from around the state and to other state and national preservation organizations.

J. Neel Reid, Architect 

Architect J. Neel Reid (and his partners in Hentz, Reid & Adler) founded the Georgia school of classicists after study at Columbia University and abroad. Many sources influenced Reid's architecture, and his interior and garden designs. His travel diary, sketchbooks and scrapbooks, and extensive library reflect this. His early-twentieth-century interest in historic preservation and contextual design, in architectural education and professional standards of practice inspired others long after his tragic early death of a brain tumor in 1926.

Reid's father's family were Troup County, Georgia, pioneers; he grew up in Macon, beginning apprenticeship and practice there before, in 1909, moving to Atlanta.

J. Neel Reid, Architect by William R. Mitchell, Jr. and published by The Georgia Trust, gives new life to Reid's rich legacy, keeping his influence fresh in this new century. The J. Neel Reid Prize, provided by a Georgia Trust fund produced from the sale of the book, helps ensure continuation of Reid's influence among a new generation of architects.

Proceeds from book sales help support the J. Neel Reid Prize, a yearly award to an architecture student, an architect intern or a recently registered architect for study travel that honors the legacy of Neel Reid.

Democracy Restored: A History of the Georgia State Capitol 

Written by Timothy J. Crimmins and Anne H. Farrisee with photographs by Diane Kirkland, the award-winning Democracy Restored is a stunning and fully illustrated history of the Georgia Capital that not only pays tribute to a grand ole edifice, but also vividly recounts the history that was made—and that continues to be made—within and without its walls. The Georgia Capitol is a place where, for more than a century, legislators have debated, governors have proclaimed, and courts have ruled. It is also a place where countless ordinary citizens have gathered in lively tour groups, angry protest mobs, and at times, solemn funeral processions.

Proceeds go to The Georgia Trust and the Capitol Restoration Fund.

See also 
 National Trust for Historic Preservation
 There are other state historic preservation organizations nationwide.

References

External links
 The Georgia Trust for Historic Preservation

State history organizations of the United States
Historic preservation organizations in the United States
Architectural history
Building Preservation Trusts